The 1st Deep Reconnaissance Strike Brigade Combat Team is a formation of the British Army, currently headquartered in Delhi Barracks, Tidworth Camp, Wiltshire, as part of the 3rd (United Kingdom) Division.

History 
As part of the Future Soldier Programme, which in turn arose from resulting from the Integrated Review of Security, Defence, Development and Foreign Policy ("Global Britain in a Competitive Age") published in March 2021, it was announced that 1st Armoured Infantry Brigade and 1st Artillery Brigade would merge to form a deep fighting formation known as 1st Deep Reconnaissance Strike Brigade Combat Team. The Brigade was officially stood up on 1 July 2022.

The brigade is designed to integrate reconnaissance assets with deep fires and non-lethal effects, utilising Ajax and MLRS systems. As the Future Soldier guide states:

Structure 
The structure of the brigade is as follows:

 1st Deep Reconnaissance Strike Brigade Combat Team
 Household Cavalry Regiment, at Powle Lines, Bulford Camp (Armoured Cavalry)
 1st The Queen's Dragoon Guards, at Caerwent Barracks, Caerwent (Light Cavalry)
 The Royal Lancers (Queen Elizabeth's Own), at Catterick Garrison (Armoured Cavalry)
 The Royal Yeomanry, in Leicester (Light Cavalry)
 1st Regiment Royal Horse Artillery, at Assaye Barracks, Tidworth Camp (Armoured Fires) 
 3rd Regiment Royal Horse Artillery, at Albemarle Barracks, Stamfordham (Deep Fires)
 5th Regiment, Royal Artillery, at Marne Barracks, Catterick Garrison (Surveillance & Target Acquisition)
 19 Regiment Royal Artillery, at Larkhill Garrison (Armoured Fires)
 26 Regiment Royal Artillery, at Purvis Lines, Larkhill Garrison (Deep Fires) 
 101 (Northumbrian) Regiment Royal Artillery, at Napier Armoury, Gateshead (Deep Fires, will provide a formed battery to each of 3 RHA and 26 Regt RA) 
 104 Regiment Royal Artillery, at Raglan Barracks, Newport (Armoured Fires, will provide individual reinforcements to 1 RHA and 19 Regt RA)
 National Reserve Headquarters, Royal Artillery, at Royal Artillery Barracks, Woolwich 
 6 Armoured Close Support Battalion, Royal Electrical and Mechanical Engineers, at Delhi Barracks, Tidworth Camp
 206 (North West) Multi-Role Medical Regiment, Royal Army Medical Corps

References

Brigades of the British Army
Artillery units and formations of the British Army
Organisations based in Wiltshire